Julus scandinavius is a species of millipede from Julidae family. It was described by Latzel in 1884 and is found in Austria, Benelux, Czech Republic, France, Germany, Hungary, Ireland, Poland, Slovakia, Switzerland, Britain I. and Scandinavia (except Finland).

References

External links
Image of Julus scandinavius
Another image of Julus scandinavius

Julida
Animals described in 1884
Millipedes of Europe